HXM may refer to:
 Hoveton & Wroxham railway station, in England
 Hexham railway station, New South Wales, Australia